Jamie Blane Martin (born February 8, 1970) is a former American football quarterback of the National Football League (NFL) and NFL Europe.  He was signed by the Los Angeles Rams as an undrafted free agent in 1993.  He played college football at Weber State.

Martin was also a member of the Washington Redskins, Jacksonville Jaguars, Cleveland Browns, New York Jets, New Orleans Saints, San Francisco 49ers, and Amsterdam Admirals football teams.

Early years
Martin attended Arroyo Grande High School in Arroyo Grande, California.  He led his team to the California Interscholastic Federation championship in 1987.

College career
Martin starred at Weber State University from 1989 to 1992.  As a freshman, he played in eight games, but showed few glimpses of his future greatness.  Martin struggled as he adjusted to football at the college level; he completed just 86 of 233 passes for 1,175 yards and nine touchdowns.

The next year (1990) was Martin's break-out season.  He completed 256 of 428 passes for 3,700 yards and 23 touchdowns.  He led the NCAA Division I-AA in passing (336.4 yards per game) and total offense (337.6 yards per game).  He was named to the First-team All-Big Sky Conference.

Martin followed his strong sophomore campaign with a spectacular junior year (1991).  He completed 310 of 500 passes for 4,125 yards and 35 touchdowns.  He again led the Division I-AA in passing (375.0 yards per game) and total offense (394.3 yards per game).  With Martin at the helm, Weber State's offense averaged 578.5 yards per game, setting a national record.  Martin set Division I-AA records for pass completions (47), passing yards (624), and total offense yards (643) in a game against Idaho State.  He also had a spectacular performance against Eastern Washington, throwing seven touchdown passes in that game.  For his efforts, Martin was named First-team All-American and was awarded the Walter Payton Award, given annually to the top Division I-AA player in the nation.

His senior season (1992) was solid, but his statistics declined from the previous year.  He finished with 282 completions in 383 attempts, totaling 3,207 yards and 20 touchdown passes.  He led the Big Sky in passing (291.5 yards per game) and earned Third-team All-American honors.  Martin finished his career as the all-time leader in passing (12,207 yards) and total offense (12,287 yards) in the history of Division I-AA football.  His 87 career touchdown passes were a Big Sky record.  He played in the 1993 East–West Shrine Game and the Hula Bowl.

Professional career

First stint with Rams
Despite his tremendous collegiate career, Martin was not drafted into the NFL.  He signed a free agent contract with the Los Angeles Rams in 1993.  He spent four seasons with the Rams franchise (two in Los Angeles, two after the team moved to St. Louis).  He played in nine games with the Amsterdam Admirals of the NFL Europe in 1995.  He saw his first action in the NFL in 1996, playing in six games with the Rams.

Washington
Martin spent 1997 as third-string quarterback for Washington Redskins of the NFL.

First stint with Jaguars
After one season in Washington, Martin joined the Jacksonville Jaguars for the 1998 season.  He played in four games with the Jaguars; his first pass attempt against Detroit went for a 67-yard touchdown.  His first career start came December 13 against Tennessee, but an ACL injury in that game ended his season.  He finished 1998 with 27 completions for 355 yards and two touchdowns; his final passer rating was 99.8 points.

Cleveland Browns
Martin joined the Cleveland Browns for the 1999 season, but spent most of the year on the inactive list.

Second stint with Jaguars
Martin re-joined the Jaguars in 2000, and saw limited action in five games.

Second stint with Rams
Martin had his second stint with the Rams from 2001–2002.  He saw significant playing time in 2002 filling in for injured quarterback Marc Bulger. He played in 5 games, starting two of them, throwing for 1,216 yards with 7 touchdowns and 10 interceptions.

New York Jets
Martin spent 2003 with the New York Jets, but did not appear in a game for them.

Third stint with Rams
Martin joined the Rams for the third time in 2004 and spent two seasons with the team.

New Orleans Saints
Martin joined the Saints in 2006 and served as a backup to Drew Brees for two seasons.

San Francisco 49ers
On September 10, 2008, Martin was signed by the San Francisco 49ers after quarterback Alex Smith was placed on injured reserve.  The move reunited Martin with 49ers offensive coordinator and former Rams head coach Mike Martz.

Current
On April 4, 2012, Martin, a drum player, founded Explode the Moon, an electric rock band that does cover songs. He is also the offensive coordinator for Parkway West High School in Ballwin, Missouri. Jamie’s wife coaches the Parkway West varsity cheerleaders. Jamie recently took ownership of Circa Pub & Grill, a restaurant in Des Peres, MO that serves traditional St. Louis dishes.

On November 15, 2014, at halftime of Weber State's victory over the University of Northern Colorado, his #10 jersey was retired by Weber State University.

1970 births
Living people
Sportspeople from Santa Ana, California
American football quarterbacks
Weber State Wildcats football players
Amsterdam Admirals players
Los Angeles Rams players
St. Louis Rams players
Washington Redskins players
San Diego Chargers players
Jacksonville Jaguars players
New Orleans Saints players
Cleveland Browns players
New York Jets players
San Francisco 49ers players
Walter Payton Award winners
Players of American football from Los Angeles
People from Arroyo Grande, California
People from Orange, California